See You There is the sixty-third and penultimate studio album by Glen Campbell.  It was recorded around the same time as Ghost on the Canvas and was put on hold when Campbell undertook his Goodbye Tour from 2011 to 2012.  The album was released on August 13, 2013 on vinyl, CD and digital.

Track listing

Chart performance

References

Glen Campbell albums
Surfdog Records albums
2013 albums
Albums produced by Julian Raymond